is a POSIX system call to wait for one or more file descriptors to become ready for use.

On *BSD and macOS, it has been largely superseded by kqueue in high performance applications.

See also 

 kqueue
 epoll
 inotify
 select

References

External links
 
 

C POSIX library
Events (computing)
System calls
Unix